Paragehyra felicitae is a species of lizard in the family Gekkonidae. The species is endemic to Madagascar.

Etymology
The specific name, felicitae, is in honor of "Dr. Felicity O'Malley".

Geographic range
P. felicitae is found in southcentral Madagascar, in the area that was formerly called Fianarantsoa Province.

References

Further reading
Crottini A, Harris DJ, Miralles A, Glaw F, Jenkins RKB, Randrianantoandro JC, Bauer AM, Vences M (2014). "Morphology and Molecules reveal Two New Species of the poorly studied Gecko Genus Paragehyra (Squamata: Gekkonidae) from Madagascar". Organism Diversity & Evolution 15: 175–198. (Paragehyra felicitae, new species).

Paragehyra
Reptiles of Madagascar
Reptiles described in 2014